The Renault Grand Prix was a race car manufactured between 1906 and 1908 by French car maker Renault. It was also known as Renault Grand Prix de l'A.C.F. (Renault Grand Prix of the Automobile Club de France). The A.C.F. Grand Prix was created in 1906, where Renault and the other racing leaders like Mercedes-Benz started racing again after the 1903 tragedy where Marcel Renault and nine other people lost their lives.

Renault adopted Michelin tyres for the car. Michelin tyres were also used one hundred years later on Renault's 2006 World Championship winning Renault R26 Formula One car.

Grand Prix
Vehicles introduced in 1906